The 2019 Copa Verde was the 6th edition of a football competition held in Brazil. Featuring 24 clubs, Acre, Amazonas, Distrito Federal, Espírito Santo, Goiás, Mato Grosso, Mato Grosso do Sul and Pará have two vacancies; Amapá, Rondônia and Roraima with one each. The others five berths was set according to CBF ranking.

In the finals, Cuiabá defeated Paysandu 5–4 on penalties after tied 1–1 on aggregate to win their second title and a place in the Round of 16 of the 2020 Copa do Brasil.

Qualified teams

Note: The state of Tocantins, which at the beginning would be represented by Palmas, was without representatives after the same give up, not being replaced by another club.

Schedule
The schedule of the competition is as follows.

First round

Draw

In the first round, each tie was played on a two-legged basis. The higher-ranked team hosted the second leg.  If the score was level, the match would go straight to the penalty shoot-out to determine the winner.

|}

Bracket

Finals

Tied 1–1 on aggregate, Cuiabá won on penalties.

References

Copa Verde
Copa Verde
Copa Verde